The Puresa-class (プレサ) locomotives were a group of steam tank locomotives with 2-6-2 wheel arrangement of used by the Chosen Government Railway (Sentetsu) in Korea. The "Pure" name came from the American naming system for steam locomotives, under which locomotives with 2-6-2 wheel arrangement were called "Prairie".

In all, Sentetsu owned 227 locomotives of all Pure classes, whilst privately owned railways owned another 52; of these 279 locomotives, 169 went to the Korean National Railroad in South Korea and 110 to the Korean State Railway in North Korea.

Description
The Puresa class was a group of 14 locomotives built in 1911 and 1912 by the Borsig works of Germany. The first nine were delivered in 1911, and the last five in 1912. They were larger than the preceding Purei- and Pureni-classes, with greater coal and water capacity, and were the first locomotives in Korea with Walschaerts valve gear. Like the previous types, they were delivered in knockdown form, and assembled at Sentetsu's shops in Busan.

Postwar
After the liberation and partition of Korea, they were divided between North and South, but the specifics of which engine went where are unclear; those going to the Korean National Railroad in the South would be designated 푸러3 (Pureo3) class, those with the Korean State Railway in the North would be designated 부러서 (Purŏsŏ) class.

Construction

References

Locomotives of Korea
Locomotives of North Korea
Locomotives of South Korea
Railway locomotives introduced in 1911
2-6-2 locomotives
Borsig locomotives